Zbigniew Roman Deptuła (born 1 March 1962) is a Polish politician from the Polish People's Party. He has served as member of the Sejm from 2001 to 2005.

References

1962 births
Living people
People from Masovian Voivodeship
Polish People's Party politicians
Members of the Polish Sejm 2001–2005